How Art Made the World is a 2005 five-part BBC One documentary series, with each episode looking at the influence of art on the current day situation of our society.

"The essential premise of the show," according to Nigel Spivey, "is that of all the defining characteristics of humanity as a species, none is more basic than the inclination to make art. Great apes will smear paint on canvas if they are given brushes and shown how, but they do not instinctively produce art any more than parrots produce conversation. We humans are alone in developing the capacity for symbolic imagery."

Episodes

Episode one: More Human Than Human...
The first episode asks why humans surround themselves with images of the body that are so unrealistic.

Spivey travels to the Naturhistorisches Museum in Vienna to examine the Venus's grotesquely exaggerated breasts and abdomen, as well as its lack of arms and face, which shows the desire to exaggerate dates back to the very first images of the human body created by our ancestors. Spivey speculates that, The people who made this statue lived in a harsh ice-age environment where features of fatness and fertility would have been highly desirable, and several similar statuettes collectively referred to as Venus figurines show that this exaggerated body image continued for millennia.

Neuroscientist Vilayanur S. Ramachandran speculates that the reason for this lies in a neurological principle known as the supernormal stimulus, which Spivey demonstrates by replicating Nikolaas Tinbergen's experiment with Herring gull chicks. When the chicks are shown a yellow stick with a single red line made to represent their mother's beak, they tap on it as they are programmed to do to demand food. However, when they are presented with a stick with three red lines they tap on it with increased enthusiasm even in comparison to the original beak. Ramachandran concludes, "I think there's an analogy here in that what's going on in the brains of our ancestors, the artists who were creating these Venus figurines were producing grossly exaggerated versions, the equivalent for their brain of what the stick with the three red stripes is for the chick's brain."

Spivey next travels to Egypt to discover if the gross exaggerations of hard-wired herring gull instincts of the nomadic artisans survived into the era of civilization. The Egyptian images of the human body, which he discovers at the Tomb of Pharaoh Rameses VI and the Karnak Temple Complex, were regular and repeated, and nothing about them was exaggerated. Mapped onto the wall at the unfinished Tomb of Amenhotep III's vizier Ramose he discovers the grid which dictated the precise proportions and composition of these images for three thousand years. The Egyptians created images of the body this way, Spivy concludes, not because of how their brains were hard-wired but because of their culture.

Spivey finally travels to Italy, where Stefano Mariottini relates his extraordinary discovery off the coast of Riace, near Reggio Calabria. As revealed in an antique copy of Herodotus in St John's College Old Library, Greek sculptors learned the Egyptians' techniques and initially created truly realistic depictions of the human body, like Kritian Boy at the Acropolis Museum in Athens, Greece. However, according to Ramachandran, the problem with the Kritian Boy is it was too realistic, that makes it boring, and the style was soon abandoned. Spivey states that, the Greeks discovered they had to do interesting things with the human form, such as distorting it in lawful ways, and examines the pioneering work of a sculptor and mathematician called Polyclitus, as exemplified in the Riace bronzes at the Museo Nazionale della Magna Grecia.  Spivey concludes that the first civilisation capable of realism had used exaggeration to go further, and it's that instinct which still dominates our world today.

Episode two: The Day Pictures Were Born
The second episode asks how the very first pictures ever made were created and reveals how images may have triggered the greatest change in human history.

Dr. Spivey begins his investigation by travelling to the Cave of Altamira near the town of Santillana del Mar in Cantabria, Spain, where in 1879 a young girl's exclamation of Papa. Look, oxen. to her father, local amateur archeologist Marcelino Sanz de Sautuola, is explained to have meant that Maria had just become the first modern human to set eyes on the first gallery of prehistoric paintings ever to be discovered. The find revealed that, About 35,000 years ago, we began to create pictures and to understand what they meant. French priest Henri Breuil believed that, prehistoric artists painted animals to increase their chances of a successful hunt, but the animals painted here and at other sites such as the Pech Merle in France, also visited by Spivey, did not match the bones discovered and abstract patterns revealed the artists weren't merely copying from real life.

Spivey next travels to the Drakensberg Mountains of South Africa, where rock painting made 200 years ago by the San people and similarly dismissed as hunting scenes, are revealed by anthropologist David Lewis-Williams to contain many of the same unusual features. 19th century interviews with the San by German linguist Wilhelm Bleek reveal the importance of trance within their culture, an observation confirmed by Spivey after watching a shamanistic ritual performed by their present-day descendants in a village near Tsumkwe, Namibia far from the mountains. Lewis-Williams theorises that, the paintings were not just pictures of everyday life, but they were about spiritual experiences in a trance state.

Media information

DVD release
Released on Region 2 DVD by BBC DVD on 30 May 2005.

Companion book
The 2005 companion book to the series was written by presenter Nigel Spivey.

Selected editions

References

External links

2005 British television series debuts
2005 British television series endings
BBC television documentaries
Documentary television series about art